Emmy Snook (born 4 October 1973) is an Australian rower. She competed in the women's coxless four event at the 1992 Summer Olympics.

References

External links
 

1973 births
Living people
Australian female rowers
Olympic rowers of Australia
Rowers at the 1992 Summer Olympics
Rowers from Perth, Western Australia
20th-century Australian women